Claremore Regional Airport  is a city-owned, public-use airport located seven nautical miles (8 mi, 13 km) east of the central business district of Claremore, a city in Rogers County, Oklahoma, United States. It is included in the National Plan of Integrated Airport Systems for 2011–2015, which categorized it as a general aviation facility.

Although most U.S. airports use the same three-letter location identifier for the FAA and IATA, this airport is assigned GCM by the FAA, but has no designation from the IATA (which assigned GCM to Owen Roberts International Airport in Grand Cayman).

Facilities and aircraft 
Claremore Regional Airport covers an area of 526 acres (213 ha) at an elevation of 733 feet (223 m) above mean sea level. It has one runway designated 17/35 with an asphalt surface measuring 5,200 by 75 feet (1,585 x 23 m).

For the 12-month period ending March 25, 2011, the airport had 12,000 general aviation aircraft operations, an average of 32 per day. At that time there were 38 aircraft based at this airport: 79% single-engine, 13% multi-engine, and 8% helicopter.

References

External links 
 Claremore Regional Airport
 Claremore Regional Airport (GCM) at Oklahoma Aeronautics Commission
 Aerial image as of February 1995 from USGS The National Map
 

Airports in Oklahoma
Buildings and structures in Rogers County, Oklahoma